Gabriel Manuel Meli (born 5 February 1999) is an Italian professional footballer who plays as a goalkeeper for  club Recanatese, on loan from Empoli.

Club career

Empoli 
Meli is a youth product of Empoli youth system. He made his first appearance for the team as an un-used substitute for the last matches of the 2015–16 season, he made also other bench appearances in the 2016–17 and 2017–18 seasons, but he never appeared on the field. Meli also won the 2017–18 Serie B title.

Loan to Pistoiese 
On 18 July 2018, Meli was loaned to Serie C club Pistoiese on a 2-year loan deal. On 26 September he made his professional debut in Serie C debut for Pistoiese in a 3–3 away draw against Pro Piacenza. On 3 November he kept his first clean sheet for Pistoiese in a 0–0 home draw against Alessandria. He became Pistoiese's first-choice early in the season. Eight days later, he kept his second consecutive clean sheet in a 0–0 away draw against Cuneo. One week later, on 18 November, he kept his third clean sheet in a 2–0 home win over Piacenza. However he became the second goalkeeper behind Jacopo Pagnini in the second part of the season. Meli ended his season-long loan to Pistoiese with 21 appearances, 5 clean sheets and 27 goals conceded. Empoli recalled him from loan early, at the end of the first season.

Loan to Rimini 
After remaining an unused goalkeeper in the first part of the season, on 21 January 2020, Meli was loaned to Serie C club Rimini on loan until the end of the season. Five days later, on 26 January, Meli made his debut for Rimini in a 3–1 home defeat against Vicenza Virtus. He became Rimini's first-choice goalkeeper in the second part season. Three weeks later, on 15 February, he kept his first clean sheet for the club in a 2–0 home win over Modena and one more week later, on 22 February, he kept his second clean sheet in a 0–0 away draw against Virtus Verona. Meli ended his 6-month loan to Rimini with only 5 appearances, 6 goals conceded and 2 clean sheet, however at the end of the season Rimini was relegated in Serie D.

Loan to Fano 
On 21 August 2020, Meli was signed by Serie C club Alma Juventus Fano on a season-long loan deal. On 27 September he made his league debut for the club in a 2–2 away draw against Perugia. Ten days later, on 7 October, Meli kept his first clean sheet for the club in a 0–0 away draw against Carpi. On 11 November he kept his second clean sheet for the club in a 0–0 away draw against Fermana and four weeks later his third clean sheet with another 0–0 away draw against Vis Pesaro. He lost the role of starting goalkeeper to Aniello Viscovo in the second half of the season. Meli ended his season-long loan to Fano with 17 appearances, all in the first part of the season, 23 goals conceded and 4 clean sheet.

Loan to Südtirol 
On 27 July 2021, he was loaned to Serie C club Südtirol.

Loan to Recanatese 
On 25 January 2023, Meli moved to Serie C club Recanatese on loan.

International career
Meli was part of the Italy squad at the 2016 UEFA European Under-17 Championship, but stayed on the bench in all games behind the first-choice goalkeeper Alessandro Plizzari.

Career statistics

Club

Honours

Club 
Empoli

 Serie B: 2017–18

References

External links
 

1999 births
Living people
People from Bagno a Ripoli
Sportspeople from the Metropolitan City of Florence
Footballers from Tuscany
Italian footballers
Italian expatriate footballers
Association football goalkeepers
Serie C players
Serie A players
Serie B players
Super League Greece 2 players
Empoli F.C. players
U.S. Pistoiese 1921 players
Rimini F.C. 1912 players
Alma Juventus Fano 1906 players
F.C. Südtirol players
Apollon Larissa F.C. players
U.S.D. Recanatese 1923 players
Italian expatriate sportspeople in Greece
Expatriate footballers in Greece
Italy youth international footballers